Tavitian is an Armenian surname, which means "son of David", thus making it equivalent to Davidson. The name may refer to:

Bernard Tavitian (born 1960), French game designer
Harry Tavitian (born 1952), Romanian musician

References

Armenian-language surnames
Patronymic surnames